Hertfordshire County Council in England is elected every four years. Since the last boundary changes, that took effect for the 2001 election, 77 councillors are elected for single member districts.

Political control
Summary of the council composition, click on the year for full details of each election.

Leadership
The leaders of the council since 1995 have been:

Result maps

By-election results

By-elections are held for any vacancies that arise between elections.

1993–1997

1997–2001

2001–2005

2005–2009

2009–2013

At the preceding election there had also been candidates for the British National Party (307 votes, 8.0%) and for the Green Party (392 votes, 10.3%).

Election caused by the resignation of previous incumbent.

Election caused by the resignation of previous incumbent. Percentage change is since June 2009.

2013–2017

Caused by the death of the previous incumbent.

2017–2021 
Council leader and Conservative councillor Robert Gordon CBE (Goffs Oak and Bury Green) died in October 2017. The seat was held for the Conservatives by Lesley Greensmith in the by-election on 22 February 2018.

Liberal Democrat councillor Charlotte Hogg (St Albans North) resigned from the council in March 2018. A by-election was held on 3 May, where Roma Mills from the Labour Party captured the seat from the Liberal Democrats.

2021 - Present

 
 
 

 

The by-election was caused by the death of the incumbent Liberal Democrat, Cllr Paul Clark in December 2021. The Lib Dem’s won with an increased majority with Labour opting not to nominate a candidate.

The by-election was caused by the death of the  Labour incumbent, Cllr Judi Billing MBE in November 2022. Labour won with an increased majority with the Lib Dem’s opting not to nominate a candidate.

References

By-election results

External links
Hertfordshire County Council

 
Politics of Hertfordshire
Council elections in Hertfordshire
County council elections in England